Chris Young is the debut album by American country music artist Chris Young, who in 2006 was a winner on the television singing competition Nashville Star. Released on Arista Nashville in 2006, the album produced two chart singles for Young on the Billboard Hot Country Songs charts: "Drinkin' Me Lonely" and "You're Gonna Love Me", which respectively reached No. 42 and No. 48, making this the only album of Young's career not to produce any top 40 hits.

The song "Flowers" was originally recorded by its co-writer, Billy Yates, who released it as a single from his self-titled debut album in 1997. "Beer or Gasoline" was co-written by David Lee Murphy and Ira Dean, the latter of whom was bassist for Trick Pony at the time.

Critical reception
Thom Jurek of Allmusic rated the album three stars out of five, criticizing Buddy Cannon's "generic" production but praising the neotraditionalist country sound of the album as well as Young's voice.

Track listing

Personnel
As listed in liner notes.
Wyatt Beard - background vocals
Pat Buchanan - electric guitar
Buddy Cannon - background vocals
Eric Darken - percussion
Thomas Flora - background vocals
Steve Gibson - electric guitar, 6 string bass
Kenny Greenberg - electric guitar
Rob Hajacos - fiddle
Wes Hightower - background vocals
David Hungate - bass guitar
Paul Leim - drums
B. James Lowry - acoustic guitar
Randy McCormick - piano, keyboards
Terry McMillan - harmonica
Liana Manis - background vocals
Phillip Moore - electric guitar
Larry Paxton - bass guitar
Gary Prim - piano, keyboards
Hargus "Pig" Robbins - piano
John Wesley Ryles - background vocals
Scotty Sanders - steel guitar, dobro
David Talbot - banjo
George Tidwell - trumpet
Jim Williamson - trumpet
John Willis - acoustic guitar, electric guitar, nylon string guitar
Lonnie Wilson - drums
Curtis Wright - background vocals
Chris Young- lead vocals

Chart performance

Album

Singles

References

2006 debut albums
Albums produced by Buddy Cannon
Arista Nashville albums
Chris Young (musician) albums